This is a List of the National Register of Historic Places in the city of Los Angeles.  (For those in the rest of Los Angeles County, go here.)

Current listings

Point Fermin Historic District,
807 West Paseo Del Mar, 3601 Gaffey St.,
San Pedro, MP100006727,
LISTED, 7/16/2021 

|}

Former listings

|}

See also

List of Los Angeles Historic-Cultural Monuments
California Historical Landmarks in Los Angeles County, California
List of National Historic Landmarks in California
National Register of Historic Places listings in California

References

External links
Given Place Media: City of Los Angeles Map

Los Angeles
Los Angeles-related lists
 
History of Los Angeles
Los Angeles, California